The 1918 Brunswick state election was held on 22 December 1918 to elect the 60 members of the Landtag of the Free State of Brunswick.

Results

References 

Brunswick
Elections in Lower Saxony